Billy Madison is a 1995 American comedy film directed by Tamra Davis. It stars Adam Sandler in the title role, Bradley Whitford, Bridgette Wilson, Norm Macdonald, Darren McGavin, Mark Beltzman, and Larry Hankin. The film was written by Sandler and Tim Herlihy and produced by Robert Simonds, and was Macdonald's feature film debut. It made over $26.4 million worldwide and debuted at number one at the box office.

Despite receiving mixed reviews from critics at the time of its release, the film is now considered one of Sandler's best and has garnered a cult following over the years.

Plot
William “Billy” Madison is the dimwitted, childish, and spoiled 27-year-old heir to Madison Hotels, a Fortune 500 chain of 650 hotels founded by his father, retiring tycoon Brian Madison. Billy spends his days drinking with friends and creating disturbances across his father's estate. One evening, Billy ruins an important dinner meeting between his father and his associates by acting obnoxiously. Brian loses confidence in his son and chooses his devious executive vice president Eric Gordon to take over Madison Hotels. When Billy begs his father to reconsider his decision, as he knows how callous and cruel Eric is, Brian reveals that he secretly bribed Billy's school teachers to give him passing grades. The two finally compromise: Billy must complete all 12 grades of school, with two weeks for each grade, to prove he is competent enough to manage the company.

Shortly after enrolling into elementary school, Billy becomes attracted to a third grade teacher named Veronica Vaughn, who initially ignores him. Nevertheless, Billy successfully progresses through his first two grades. He finds himself as one of Veronica's students in third grade and earns her respect by standing up for Ernie, his friend and classmate. Billy becomes popular among the third graders and misses them as he advances through school. Billy's progress alarms Eric. Desperate to take over Madison Hotels, he blackmails Billy's elementary school principal, Max Anderson, into lying that Billy bribed him for passing grades, with a wrestling magazine containing pictures of Max's previous career as the "Revolting Blob", a masked wrestler who accidentally killed a man in the ring.

Angered, Brian calls off his deal with Billy and renames Eric as chairman to the company. Billy grows distraught and reverts to his previous carefree lifestyle. Veronica motivates him to return to school, while his grade school classmates convince Max to retract his false accusations, infuriating Eric. Brian agrees to give Billy another chance but Eric cites that Billy failed the challenge by not finishing ninth grade within two weeks. He then threatens to sue Brian if he does not pass the company onto him. Billy intervenes and challenges Eric to an academic decathlon to finally settle their feud with the winner getting to take over Madison Hotels.

Both men excel in different activities, but Billy manages to take a single-point lead before the contest's final event, a Jeopardy!-style academic test. Billy gives a completely dimwitted answer for the opening question in the event, and Eric is given the chance to win the contest by answering a question regarding business ethics. Eric, being a highly unscrupulous businessman, cannot conceive of an answer and breaks down. He brandishes a revolver, but Max (in his wrestling gear) tackles Eric from backstage before he can harm Billy. Eric recovers from the attack and attempts to shoot Veronica, but he is shot in the buttock by Danny McGrath, a rifle-wielding madman whom Billy apologized to earlier for bullying him years ago.

At his graduation ceremony, Billy, deciding that he is not fit for running a hotel company, announces he will pass Madison Hotels to Carl Alphonse, Brian's polite and loyal operations manager, and reveals he plans to attend college in order to become a teacher. Eric, recently fired by Brian and now walking on crutches due to his wound, watches on and fumes in frustration over Billy's decision.

Cast

 Adam Sandler as William "Billy" Madison
 Darren McGavin as Brian Madison
 Bridgette Wilson as Veronica Vaughn
 Bradley Whitford as Eric Gordon
 Josh Mostel as Principal Max Anderson
 Norm Macdonald as Frank
 Mark Beltzman as Jack
 Larry Hankin as Carl Alphonse
 Theresa Merritt as Juanita
 Jim Downey as Principal/Judge of the decathlon
 Hrant Alianak as Pete
 Dina Platias as Ms. Lippy
 Robert Smigel as Mr. Oblaski
 Steve Buscemi as Danny McGrath (uncredited)
 Chris Farley as Bus Driver (uncredited)
 Greg Valcov as The Penguin (uncredited)

Production
Filming took place from June 26 to August 29, 1994, in and around Toronto, Ontario, Canada. Sandler had initially tapped Stephen Kessler to direct the film; however, after two weeks of production, Universal was unhappy with the footage and had replaced him with Tamra Davis. The Madison's Mansion exterior and grounds were shot at the Parkwood Estate in Oshawa while the interior was filmed in Casa Loma in Toronto. The entrance to the mansion was filmed at Marylake Augustinian Monastery in King City.

While on Norm Macdonald Live, Adam Sandler revealed that the role of Jack was intended for Allen Covert. Sandler wanted Bob Odenkirk for the role of Eric Gordon but the studio rejected it. Sandler also wanted Philip Seymour Hoffman for the role, Hoffman auditioned and later turned it down. For his scene as the Bus Driver, Farley drank six shots of Espresso to prepare for his scene.

Reception

Critical response

On the film review aggregation site Rotten Tomatoes, the film holds an approval rating of 41% based on 49 reviews, with an average rating of 4.8/10. The website's critical consensus reads, "Audiences who enjoy Adam Sandler's belligerent comic energy may find him in joyously obnoxious form as Billy Madison, but this thinly-plotted starring vehicle surrounds its star with an aggressively pedestrian movie." On Metacritic, the film received a weighted average score of 16 out of 100, based on 13 critics, indicating "overwhelming dislike".

Richard Schickel panned the film, calling it "one of the most execrable movies ever made". Peter Rainer of the Los Angeles Times commented; "Sandler has a bad habit of thinking he is funnier than we are". On At the Movies, Gene Siskel and Roger Ebert both gave the film thumbs down, and Roger Ebert said of Sandler, "...Not an attractive screen presence. He might have a career as a villain or as a fall guy or the butt of a joke, but as the protagonist his problem is that he recreates the fingernails on the blackboard syndrome." Gene Siskel added "...you don't have a good motivation for the character's behavior". Owen Gleiberman also panned the film, saying "By the end, you feel like a drill sergeant—you want to wipe that stupid grin off Sandler's face". Rita Kempley of The Washington Post said the film was trying to be "A more kid-friendly version of Dumb and Dumber.' And there's even a moral: 'Yahoo for education,' though the movie doesn't really put any muscle behind it."

Janet Maslin of The New York Times gave the film a mixed review, saying "It succeeds as a reasonably smart no-brainer. If you've ever had a yearning to relive the third grade, this must be the next best thing." Brian Lowry of Variety also gave the film a mixed review, saying "There are a few bursts of sheer, irresistible idiocy—along the lines of Wayne's World or even Pee-wee's Big Adventure—but not enough to sustain the more arid stretches."

Billy Mowbray of Film4 gave the film a positive review, writing: "When you get that Sandler's comedic persona is meant to be annoying, like Beavis and Butthead or Cartman, the laughs come thick and fast". Kevin N. Laforest said, "Okay, the plot is inane, but it's the basis of a series of really funny scenes."

Award nominations

Music
 Songs featured in the film
 "I'll Tumble 4 Ya" by Culture Club
 "Beat on the Brat" by The Ramones
 "ABC" by The Jackson 5
 "I'm Not the One" by The Cars
 "The Stroke" by Billy Squier
 "Telephone Line" by Electric Light Orchestra
 "Renegade" by Styx
 "Old John Braddelum" by Sharon, Lois & Bram

References

External links

 
 
 

1995 comedy films
1995 films
American coming-of-age comedy films
1990s English-language films
Films about the education system in the United States
Films directed by Tamra Davis
Films produced by Robert Simonds
Films set in 1994
Films shot in Toronto
Films with screenplays by Adam Sandler
Films with screenplays by Tim Herlihy
Universal Pictures films
Films scored by Randy Edelman
1990s American films